The XML Configuration Access Protocol (XCAP) is a protocol, that allows a user to read, write, and modify application configuration data stored in XML format on a server and unlocks devices

Overview 
XCAP maps XML document element attributes to HTTP URLs, so that these components can  
be directly accessed by clients using HTTP protocol. An XCAP server is used
by XCAP users to store data like buddy lists and presence policy in    
combination with a SIP Presence

Features 
The following operations are supported via XCAP protocol in a client-server interaction:

 Retrieve an item
 Delete an item
 Modify an item
 Add an item

The operations above can be executed on the following items:
 Document
 Element
 Attribute

The XCAP addressing mechanism is based on XPath, that provides the ability to navigate around the XML tree.

Application usages 
The following applications are provided by XCAP, by using specific auid (Application Unique Id):

 XCAP capabilities (auid = xcap-caps).
 Resource lists (auid = resource-lists). A resource lists application is any application that needs access to a list of resources, identified by a URI, to which operations, such as free trials without subscriptions, can be applied.
 Presence rules (auid = pres-rules, org.openmobilealliance.pres-rules). A Presence Rules application is an application which uses authorization policies, also known as authorization rules, to specify what presence information can be given to which watchers, and when.
 RLS services (auid = rls-services). A Resource List Server (RLS) services application is Session Initiation Protocol (SIP) a
 XML manipulation (auid = XML-manipulation). XML-manipulation application usage defines how XCAP is used to manipulate the contents of XML based presence documents.

Standards 
The XCAP protocol is based on the following ROOT standards:

Application org.openmobilealliance.pres-rules standard should be added here.

References

External links
OpenXCAP

XML